Sphenarches bifurcatus is a moth of the family Pterophoridae that can be found in the Democratic Republic of the Congo (Haut-Katanga).

References

Moths described in 2009
Platyptiliini
Moths of Africa
Insects of the Democratic Republic of the Congo
Endemic fauna of the Democratic Republic of the Congo